Callipara ponsonbyi is a species of sea snail, a marine gastropod mollusk in the family Volutidae, the volutes.

References

 Bail, P & Poppe, G. T. 2001. A conchological iconography: a taxonomic introduction of the recent Volutidae. Hackenheim-Conchbook, 30 pp, 5 pl. (updated October 2008 for WoRMS)
 Aiken R.P. (2010) Volutidae. pp. 314–333, in: Marais A.P. & Seccombe A.D. (eds), Identification guide to the seashells of South Africa. Volume 1. Groenkloof: Centre for Molluscan Studies. 376 pp.

	

Volutidae
Gastropods described in 1801